Sunbury is a village in Saint Philip Parish in Barbados.

History
The Sunbury Plantation House is open to tours and dates back to its construction by Matthew Chapman in 1660.

References

Populated places in Barbados